Befotaka is a district of Atsimo-Atsinanana in Madagascar.

References 

Districts of Atsimo-Atsinanana